Mennetou-sur-Cher is a commune in the Loir-et-Cher department of central France.

Population

Personalities
The writer Michel Breitman (1926–2009) was born in Mennetou-sur-Cher.

See also
Communes of the Loir-et-Cher department

References

Communes of Loir-et-Cher